The 'Ghana Atomic Energy Commission (GAEC) is the state organization in Ghana involved with surveillance of the use of nuclear energy in Ghana. It is similar in aim to the Ghana Nuclear Society (GNS), with the difference being that the GNS is a nonprofit organisation, whereas the GAEC is part of the parliament of Ghana. Its primary objectives were set out by the parliament act 588, which involve investigating the use of nuclear energy for Ghana and supporting research and development both in Ghana and abroad.

Sub-Divisions

 National Nuclear Research Institute (NNRI):
 School of Nuclear and Allied Sciences (SNAS):

Responsible for preservation, maintenance and enhancement of nuclear knowledge in Ghana and Africa through the provision of high-quality teaching, research, entrepreneurship training, service and development of postgraduate programmes in the nuclear sciences and technology.

 Radiation Protection Institute (RPI): 
Authorize, inspect and control all activities and practices involving sealed radiation sources, ionizing radiation and other sources, radioactive materials and x-rays used in hospitals in Ghana. Implementation of safety culture by providing adequate human resource development in radiation and waste safety for management and operating organizations. Conduct research and technical services in radiation and waste safety.

 Biotechnology and Nuclear Agriculture Research Institute (BNARI):

See also

 Nuclear power in Ghana
 Nuclear power by country

References

External links 

Council for Scientific and Industrial Research – Ghana

Nuclear power in Ghana
Nuclear organizations
2012 establishments in Ghana
Radiation protection organizations